Product Perfect was the debut album of Fàshiön Music (later known as Fashion), released in 1979. It is their only album to feature guitarist–vocalist Luke James. The album has more of a "punk" sound than its synth-driven successors.

It was re-released on CD in 2008.

Track listing
All tracks written by James/Cottrell/Davis/Mulligan.

Original UK and US release
 "Product Perfect" – 3:51
 "Die in the West" – 4:12
 "Red, Green and Gold" – 4:40
 "Burning Down" – 3:27
 "Big John/Hanoi Annoys Me/Innocent" – 7:24
 "Citinite" – 5:18
 "Don't Touch Me" – 3:00
 "Bike Boys" – 5:05
 "Fashion" – 3:30
 "Technofascist" – 3:35

Release on CD (2008)
 "Product Perfect" 
 "Die in the West"
 "Red, Green and Gold"
 "Burning Down"
 "Big John"
 "Hanoi Annoys Me"
 "Innocent"
 "Citinite"
 "Don't Touch Me"
 "Bike Boys"
 "Fashion"
 "Technofascist"

This CD release was issued by Luke and mastered from mp3. Two of the tracks from side 2 are alternate versions to those on the LP.

Luke also issued a CD with all the singles and b-sides. Mastering source unknown.

Personnel
Fàshiön Music
Lûke - vocals, guitar
Mulligán - bass guitar, synthesizer, vocals
Dïk - drums and percussion, harp, vocals

Additional personnel
Miki Cottrell - producer, sound engineer

References

External links
Fashion on IRS records

1979 debut albums
Fashion (band) albums
I.R.S. Records albums